The Annexation of Western Sahara was the occupation and incorporation of Western Sahara into Morocco in two stages in 1976 and 1979. On 14 April 1976 the area was annexed by Morocco and Mauritania via the Western Sahara partition agreement, following the two countries' occupation of the area which began on 30 October 1975, and on 14 August 1979 Morocco annexed the remaining territory following Mauritania's withdrawal and renunciation.

Annexation is illegal under international law. Under international law, Morocco's annexation of Western Sahara is null and void, such that the territory is not a legal part of Morocco and it remains under the international laws of military occupation.

The annexation was supported by the United States, which in 2020 became the only country to formally recognise it as part of the Israel–Morocco normalization agreement.

Background
As Spain began the process of decolonization of Western Sahara, a number of international bodies were asked to opine on the territories' status. The UN visiting mission to Spanish Sahara, carried out in May 1975, published their report on 15 October 1975. On the next day, on 16 October 1975, the International Court of Justice Advisory Opinion on Western Sahara was published. Both reports supported a referendum of the people of Western Sahara; the ICJ report acknowledged that Western Sahara had historical links with Morocco and Mauritania, but not sufficient to prove the sovereignty of either State over the territory at the time of the Spanish colonization. The population of the territory thus possessed the right of self-determination.

1975: start of the occupation
On 31 October 1975, Moroccan troops began an invasion of Western Sahara from the north.

The Moroccan government’s Green March took place on 6 November 1975, in which 350,000 unarmed Moroccans converged on the city of Tarfaya in southern Morocco and waited for a signal from King Hassan II of Morocco to cross the border in a peaceful march. 

The Madrid Accords were signed by Spain with Morocco and Mauritania on 14 November 1975.

The Moroccan and Mauritanian annexations were resisted by the Polisario Front, primarily by guerrilla warfare, which had gained backing from Algeria.

1976: annexation and partition
Following the occupation, on 14 April 1976, the Western Sahara partition agreement was signed to formalize the annexation and agree the borders between Morocco and Mauritania. Morocco annexed the northern two-thirds of Western Sahara as its Southern Provinces, and Mauritania annexed the southern third as Tiris al-Gharbiyya.

1979: Mauritanian withdrawal and Morocco further annexation
In 1979, Mauritania withdrew due to pressure from Polisario, including a bombardment of its capital and other economic targets. 

On 14 August 1979, Morocco extended its control and annexed the rest of the territory.

Similar events 
Armed Conflicts over "non-self-governing territories" in the Name of "Restoration of Inherent Territories".
 Annexation of Goa
 Ifni war
 Falkland War

References

Annexation
History of Western Sahara